The Free Church of Scotland  is an evangelical, Calvinist denomination in Scotland. It was historically part of the original Free Church of Scotland that remained outside the union with the United Presbyterian Church of Scotland in 1900. Now, it remains a distinct Presbyterian denomination in Scotland.

The Free Church was and still is sometimes colloquially known by the term The Wee Frees, even though, in 21st century Scotland, it is the largest Presbyterian denomination after the national church. Since this term was originally used in comparing the Free Church with the United Free Church (which is now a much smaller denomination), the Free Church of Scotland now deprecates the use of the term.

Theology and doctrine
The church maintains its commitment to Calvinist theology (as espoused by the Westminster Confession). Its polity is Presbyterian. A complete psalter in modern English was published in 2003. Its offices and theological college remain on The Mound, Edinburgh, although the denomination no longer holds the original Free Church College buildings.

The Free Church continues to be evangelical in character, presenting its understanding of the Christian message, namely that Jesus Christ is sole Lord and Saviour.

The Free Church of Scotland opposes both abortion and same-sex marriage. It has also stated its opposition to banning conversion therapy.

History

Aftermath of the union of 1900

In 1900 the Free Church of Scotland united with the United Presbyterian Church of Scotland to form the United Free Church of Scotland. However, a minority of the original Free Church remained outside this new union. The protesting and dissenting minority at once claimed to be the legitimate Free Church. They met outside the Free Assembly Hall on 31 October and, failing to gain admission, withdrew to another hall, where they elected Rev Colin Bannatyne as Moderator and held the remaining sittings of their Assembly. It was reported that between 16,000 and 17,000 names had been received of persons adhering to the anti-unionist principle. It has been estimated that the number of Free Church communicants dropped from a little under 300,000 in 1899 to just over 4,000 in 1900.

At the Assembly of 1901 it was stated that the Free Church had twenty-five ministers and at least sixty-three congregations, with most being found in the Gaelic-speaking districts of Scotland.

The initial problems were obvious: the congregations soon grew in number, but were far apart; there were not nearly enough ministers; the church was treated in a hostile manner by the United Free Church; work was conducted under considerable hardship; and there was little success in appealing to the general popular sentiment of Scotland. However, the revenue of the church gradually increased; in 1901, the sustentation fund was able to support only 75 ministers, but by 1903 it maintained 167.

The Free Church case

After the union of 1900, the United Presbyterian Church and the continuing Free Church not only contested the legacy of the Free Church of 1843–1900, but also claimed its assets. After attempts at agreement failed, the matter ended in the Scottish courts. The litigation was initially decided in favour of the Free Church by the House of Lords in 1904, on the basis that in the absence of a power to change fundamental doctrines in the trust deed, a dissenting minority retains the property. As it was not possible for the Free Church to use all the property, Parliament intervened, generally securing for the church the congregational property she could effectively use plus a significant share of central assets.

The Church in the 20th century

In 1906, a Free Church College was re-established in Edinburgh and by 1925 there were 91 ministers and 170 congregations in 12 presbyteries. The general magazine of the Free Church is The Monthly Record and there are magazines for young people. Two of the professors in the Free Church College began a theological journal the Evangelical Quarterly in 1929, but in 1942 control passed outside the church, initially to Inter Varsity Fellowship. Today the College offers degrees in conjunction with the University of Glasgow.

Post-1945, the Free Church engaged with the wider evangelical cause, but after its growth in the early decades, it began a statistical decline that, except for a short period in the 1980s, continued throughout the 20th century.

2000 events

In the 1980s and 1990s there were allegations of sexual misconduct against Donald Macleod, principal of the Free Church College. No misconduct was ever proven against Macleod; he was tried and acquitted in 1996 in the civil courts. A  to Macleod pursued the charges in church courts, to no avail.

There was considerable dissatisfaction with the handling of the charges, and claims of a cover-up.  Maurice Roberts of the Free Church Defence Association (FCDA) publicly reiterated the accusations, and denounced the General Assembly for its "wickedness and hypocrisy". He was suspended for contumacy. His supporters demanded his reinstatement and  the FCDA. In January 2000, 22 FCDA ministers were removed from their pulpits. These and other ministers formed the Free Church of Scotland (Continuing) (FCC); they are approximately 20% of the ministerial strength of the pre-2000 Free Church of Scotland. From 2005 to 2010, the Free Church of Scotland saw an 18% drop in its membership.

Following the split, the Free Church Continuing sought a declarator from the Court of Session as to ownership of the central funds and properties of the church. In a landmark decision, Lady Paton dismissed their action without granting absolvitor. The Continuing Church then said they would appeal Lady Paton's decision, but ultimately chose not to proceed. In March 2007, the Free Church filed suit to reclaim the church manse at Broadford, Isle of Skye. Lord Uist ruled that the property belonged to the Free Church. The Continuing Church had to pay the expenses of the Free Church. The Continuing Church appealed to the Inner House of the Court of Session, which upheld Lord Uist.

List of Moderators

 1900: Colin Archibald Bannatyne, Coulter, South Lanarkshire
 1901: James Duff MacCulloch, Hope Street, Glasgow
 1902: Donald MacKinnon Macalister, Edinburgh
 1903: Angus Galbraith, Lochalsh
 1904: Murdoch MacQueen, Kiltearn
 1905: Ewan Macleod, Oban
 1906: Colin Archibald Bannatyne, Free Church College
 1907: Murdo Mackenzie, Inverness; Interim Moderator J. C. Robertson (resigned)
 1908: William MacKinnon, Gairloch
 1909: James Hendry, Forres/Burghead
 1910: John Kennedy Cameron, Free Church College
 1911: William Menzies Alexander, Free Church College
 1912: William Fraser, Strathpeffer, Dingwall
 1913: Samuel Lyle Orr, Glasgow
 1914: Finlay MacRae, Plockton
 1915: John MacDonald, Rosskeen
 1916: Angus Mackie, Kingussie
 1917: John Macleod, Urray
 1918: Donald Munro, Ferintosh, Black Isle
 1919: Donald Maclean, Free Church College
 1920: John Macleod, Inverness
 1921: Roderick Macleod, Knock, Isle of Lewis
 1922: Norman Campbell, Dingwall
 1923: George Mackay, Fearn
 1924: Kenneth Cameron, Stornoway
 1925: Robert Moore, Free Church College
 1926: Alexander Stewart, Edinburgh
 1927: Alexander Dewar, South Africa
 1928: Archibald Donald Cameron, Creich
 1929: John R. Mackay, Free Church College
 1930: Robert M. Knox, Edinburgh
 1931: Alexander Macdonald Renwick, Free Church College
 1932: Peter Clarkson	
 1933: A. M. Ross
 1934: Duncan MacDonald	
 1935: Alexander Ross	
 1936: Peter W. Miller
 1937: Donald MacLean	
 1938: John MacKay MacLennan, Lairg	
 1939: Farquhar Matheson, Stoer
 1940: William MacLeod
 1941: John Shaw	
 1942: John Calvin MacKay, Kincardine & Croick, Sutherland
 1943: D. MacKenzie	
 1944: Ewen MacRury, Glen Urquhart
 1945: Roderick Alick Finlayson, Free Church College
 1946: William Fraser	
 1947: William Campbell	
 1948: Alexander MacDonald
 1949: G.N.M. Collins
 1950: A. MacLeod
 1951: Murdoch MacRae Kinloch, Isle of Lewis 
 1952: John A Macdonald, Kiltearn
 1953: Alex R Fraser, Dumbarton
 1954: Duncan Leitch, Dingwall
 1955: John Morrison, Ness
 1956: Murdoch Campbell, Resolis
 1957: Murdoch Macphail, Croy
 1958: William R MacKay, Kingussie
 1959: Hugh G MacKay, Aberdeen
 1960: A M Renwick, Free Church College
 1961: R J Murray, Killearnan and Fortrose, Black Isle
 1962: William John Cameron, Free Church College; son of Rev Kenneth Cameron
 1963: R C Christie, Saltcoats
 1964: Angus Finlayson, North Tolsta
 1965: James W Fraser, Buccleuch & Greyfriars, Edinburgh
 1966: James MacIntosh, Colegio San Andres, Peru
 1967: Murdo MacLeod, Tarbat
 1968: John R Aitken, Rogart
 1969: Clement Graham, Tain
 1970: Murdo K Murray, Knock, Isle of Lewis
 1971: G N M Collins, Free Church College
 1972: Donald MacDonald, Greyfriars, Inverness
 1973: George C Dunnett, Knockbain
 1974: A.G. Ross, Oban
 1975: Duncan MacLeay, Snizort
 1976: Kenneth J Nicolson, Barvas
 1977: William John Cameron, Free Church College
 1978: Hugh Ferrier, Free North, Inverness
 1979: Murdo MacRitchie, Stornoway
 1980: Hector Cameron, Aberdeen
 1981: Donald Gillies, Lochs
 1982: Donald Lamont, St. Columba's, Edinburgh
 1983: John MacLeod, Point, Lewis
 1984: Murdo A Macleod, Christian Witness to Israel
 1985: Archibald C Boyd, Free Church College
 1986: Angus Smith, Cross
 1987: Fergus A J Macdonald, United Bible Societies
 1988: John A Gillies, Partick Highland, Glasgow
 1989: Kenneth W R Cameron, Thurso & Reay
 1990: A Gollan, Lochcarron
 1991: W D Graham, Southern Africa
 1992: Donald MacDonald, Carloway
 1993: Clement Graham, Free Church College
 1994: Alex Murdo Macleod, Kinloch, Lewis
 1995: Murdo A MacLeod, Stornoway
 1996: Neil Macdonald, Fearn
 1997: Donald M MacDonald, Bishopbriggs
 1998: D K Macleod, Kingussie & Alvie
 1999: K Macleod, Barvas, Isle of Lewis
 2000: John M MacPherson, London
 2001: W M MacKay, Peru
 2002: J H MacLean, Kilmuir, Stenscholl & Snizort, Isle of Skye
 2003: R G MacKay, Free North, Inverness
 2004: Fergus A J Macdonald, United Bible Societies
 2005: Alex J MacDonald, Buccleuch & Greyfriars, Edinburgh
 2006: D Smith, Peru
 2007: J S Ross, Greyfriars & Stratherrick, Inverness
 2010: David Meredith, Smithton-Culloden
 2011: Rev James Maciver, Knock, Isle of Lewis
 2012: Iain D. Campbell, Point, Lewis
 2013: Angus J. Howat
 2014: David Miller, Cobham, Kent
 2015: David Robertson, Dundee
 2016: John Nicholls, Smithon, Inverness
 2017: Derek Lamont, St. Columba's, Edinburgh
 2018: Angus MacRae, Dingwall & Strathpeffer
 2019: Donnie G. MacDonald, Portree
 2021: Neil MacMillan, Cornerstone, Morningside, Edinburgh
 2022: Iver Martin, Edinburgh Theological Seminary

Recent history 

At the 2011 census, 10,896 people identified as being "Free Church of Scotland". The Free Church has about 100 congregations in Scotland and circa 80 ministers and 8,000 attenders. About 50 dissenting or former Church of Scotland congregations had been talking about joining the Free Kirk because the Church of Scotland's ordination of openly gay ministers.

Growth 
As of 2021, the Free Church had an average attendance at Sunday services of 8,000 including 5,400 communicants. As of May 2013 the Free Church worship attendance was 12,639, up from 12,431 in 2007. The number of people under 30 increased by 30% since 2007. The church is growing outwith the Western Islands, especially in the bigger cities. Sunday school attendance has grown by 25% in recent years, from 575 to 709 in 2013.

In 2013, Murdo Murchison, an elder from Dunblane Free Church gathered a core group to plant a church in Stirling. With some growth it was recognised as a church plant in 2014 by the Glasgow Presbytery, and in 2016 appointed Iain MacAskill as its minister. There had previously been no Free Church in Stirling since 1948.

In 2014 two congregations, the North Harris Free Church, and the Stornoway group of the High Free Church Stornoway and two former Kirk ministers have recently joined the Free Church, makes it total about ten former Kirk pastors who have joined the Free Church. North Harris held its first service with around 100 people in attendance. Kirkmuirhill congregation and New Restalrig have also joined. 
The High Free Church has regularly attracted around 300 people in Stornoway Primary School since leaving the Church of Scotland earlier this year.
Stornoway High was previously the Church of Scotland's biggest congregation on the Western Isles.
In early 2015 an Inverness Church of Scotland pastor quit, and took some of his flock with him to set up a new Free Church congregation in the west of Inverness. Rev McMillan was unhappy about the Presbytery of Inverness, which voted against controversial plans to give congregations the freedom to appoint a person in a gay relationship if they wished.
Other new churches welcomed into the Free Church included a new church in Leith planted originally in association with the Associate Reformed Presbyterian Church in the USA. and Christ Church, Craigintinney, a new church plant led by David Court. David led most of the congregation of New Restalrig out of the Church of Scotland.

In 2015 the Covenant Church in Newmilns, East Ayrshire joined the Free Church. Covenant Church had split from the Church of Scotland in 2013.

The number of congregations have grown to 139 in the end of 2015.

New churches continue to be planted, such as in Dunfermline and St Andrews and most recently Montrose in November 2015 and Charleston, Dundee in September 2017 by the existing Dundee church. There has been an increase in the numbers applying to the Free Church ministry, and studying in its Saturday course (provided by the Edinburgh Theological Seminary).

Worship

Church services

Typically, Free Church services are at 11 am and 6:30 pm on Sunday Sabbath, or the Lord's Day. A typical order of service is:
 A singing of praise
 A prayer
 A second singing of praise
 A reading from the Bible
 A third singing of praise
 The sermon
 A second prayer
 A fourth singing of praise
 The benediction

Intimations may be read out before the first singing (in effect, before the actual service begins) or immediately after the reading, or before the benediction.

A 'first' reading may appear between the first singing and the first prayer. This reading will be of relevance to the 'main' reading.

A message to the children may appear after the first prayer, and children may depart for Sunday school or Bible class after the second singing. Lay preachers will replace the benediction with a short prayer.

Church music
Since just after the union of 1900 until the events of 2010, only the psalms of the Old Testament (and in a very few instances, paraphrases of other parts of the Bible) were sung during the services. Musical instruments were never used.  However, in November 2010, a special plenary assembly took place to debate and vote on allowing the singing of hymns and use of musical instruments in Free Church services. The motion was passed by a narrow margin. A number of ministers insisted on recording their dissent over the decision. One congregation and four ministers resigned over the decision. The November 2010 motion allowed that instruments can be used as an accompaniment and hymns may be sung, though at least one of the items of sung praise must be a psalm; some congregations continue to sing unaccompanied psalms only.

In 2003 the church's Psalmody and Praise Committee produced a new Psalter called Sing Psalms.  Although of a similar format to the Scottish Psalter it contains metrical versions of the psalms with 21st century vocabulary and grammar.

Congregations and affiliations

There are over 100 congregations throughout Scotland, one in London and three pastoral charges in North America. The Church has maintained an extensive missionary commitment for its size, with missions in India, Peru and South Africa, which now have self-governing status.

Along with the Evangelical Presbyterian Church in England and Wales and the Free Church of Scotland (Continuing), the denomination is one of the three members of the International Conference of Reformed Churches from Great Britain, and one of seven European Christian denominations who founded the European Conference of Reformed Churches. There is a close relationship with the Presbyterian Church of Eastern Australia.

References

Bibliography
 Cameron, N., et al. (eds.) (1993). Dictionary of Scottish Church History and Theology. Edinburgh: T. & T. Clark. . .

External links

Free Church of Scotland College
Congregational Websites

Calvinist organizations
Evangelical churches in the United Kingdom
Presbyterianism in Scotland
Religious organisations based in Scotland
Free Church of Scotland
Christian organizations established in 1900
1900 establishments in Scotland
Anti-abortion organisations in the United Kingdom
Opposition to same-sex marriage
Reformed denominations in the United Kingdom
Presbyterian denominations in Canada